Jessica Elizabeth Morden (born 29 May 1968) is a British Labour Party politician serving as the Member of Parliament (MP) for Newport East since 2005.

Early life and career
Morden was born in Surrey, England and brought up in Cwmbran and educated at Croesyceiliog School before reading History at University of Birmingham.

In 1991, Morden worked for Huw Edwards, MP for Monmouth and between 1992 and 1995 she worked for Llew Smith, MP for Blaenau Gwent. Before becoming an MP, Morden was General Secretary of the Welsh Labour and organized some of the election campaigns for the 1997 election.

Parliamentary career
Morden was selected as the Labour Party candidate for Newport East in 2005 by the all-women shortlists method. She was elected as the first female MP in South East Wales with a 6,800 majority.

Jessica served as Parliamentary Private Secretary to the Secretary of State for Wales The Rt Hon Peter Hain MP until May 2010, and later as Shadow Parliamentary Private Secretary to Owen Smith MP during his time as Shadow Secretary of State for Wales.
In her first term Jessica successfully completed the Police Parliamentary Scheme, spending a month during recess with a range of Departments and frontline Police Officers in Gwent Police. She was also appointed by the Speaker to the Members’ Advisory Committee to oversee the setting up of the first ever Nursery in the House of Commons.
Jessica served as a Senior Whip in the Opposition Whips’ office with responsibility for EU Withdrawal, Wales and Prime Minister's Questions.

Morden claimed a total of £167,060 in expenses in 2007/08, the 30th highest amount claimed by the 643 members of the House of Commons. Within approved guidelines, Morden used some of the expenses allowance which was unspent from the previous year to provide additional office space after having a baby; the previous year she claimed £133,592, the 406th highest that year.

In March 2008 Jessica Morden was criticized by some of her constituents after voting against a Conservative parliamentary motion to halt the closure of hundreds of Post Offices whilst simultaneously campaigning to save the Christchurch Road branch in Newport East.

She supported Owen Smith in the failed attempt to replace Jeremy Corbyn in the 2016 Labour leadership election.

Jessica Morden was re-elected at the 2017 general election with a much increased majority of 8,003.

She was again re-elected in 2019 general election with a reduced majority of 1,992.

Charity work
Morden is one of nine presidents of The Young People's Trust for the Environment.

References

External links
Jessica Morden MP official constituency website
Jessica Morden MP Labour Party profile

1968 births
Living people
People from Cwmbran
UK MPs 2005–2010
UK MPs 2010–2015
UK MPs 2015–2017
UK MPs 2017–2019
UK MPs 2019–present
Politics of Newport, Wales
Welsh Labour Party MPs
Female members of the Parliament of the United Kingdom for Welsh constituencies
Alumni of the University of Birmingham
People educated at Croesyceiliog School
21st-century British women politicians
Labour Party (UK) officials